A New Career in a New Town (1977–1982) is a box set by English singer-songwriter David Bowie, released on 29 September 2017. A follow-up to the compilations Five Years (1969–1973) and Who Can I Be Now? (1974–1976), the set covers Bowie's career from 1977 to 1982, including his "Berlin Trilogy", over eleven compact discs or thirteen LPs. Exclusive to the box set are a Heroes EP, which compiles versions of his song "Heroes" recorded in different languages, a new version of Lodger (1979), remixed by coproducer Tony Visconti, and Re:Call 3, a compilation of non-album singles, single versions, and B-sides that serves as a sequel to Re:Call 1 from Five Years and Re:Call 2 from Who Can I Be Now? and features the Baal EP (1982) in its entirety on CD for the first time.

The box set also includes remastered editions of Low, "Heroes", Lodger (in original mix), Stage (in original and 2017 versions), and Scary Monsters (And Super Creeps).

The set comes with a hardcover book with photographs by Anton Corbijn, Helmut Newton, Andrew Kent, Steve Schapiro, Duffy and many others, as well as historical press reviews and technical notes about the albums from producer Tony Visconti.

Criticism
The box attracted criticism by fans and music reviewers, including Henry Rollins, as heavier changes to the music in the mixing and mastering process through Visconti became clear.

A volume shift in the song "Heroes" had received particular notice, which Parlophone proceeded to describe as intentional and unalterable, because of damages in the original master tapes. After the critical voices wouldn't lessen, a statement was released on the official Bowie website, announcing corrected replacement discs for the "Heroes" CD and LP; the replacement disc offer lasted until June 2018. The amended remaster featured on the replacement discs was also used for the standalone CD and LP release of "Heroes" in early 2018.

Track listing

Low (2017 remaster)

"Heroes" (2017 remaster)

"Heroes" EP

Stage (original version) (2017 remaster)

Stage (2017 version)

Lodger (2017 remaster)

Lodger (Tony Visconti 2017 mix)

Scary Monsters (and Super Creeps) (2017 remaster)

Re:Call 3 (remastered tracks)

Charts

References

David Bowie compilation albums
2017 compilation albums
Parlophone compilation albums
Albums produced by Tony Visconti
Albums produced by David Bowie